O Bem-Amado is a Brazilian telenovela that first aired on Rede Globo in 1973. It is based on a play by Dias Gomes called Odorico, o Bem-Amado ou Os Mistérios do Amor e da Morte, written in 1962. It was the first Brazilian color telenovela. It was shot in Rio de Janeiro.

A notable feature of this telenovela was its music, composed by Vinícius de Moraes and Toquinho.

Cast
 Paulo Gracindo - Odorico Paraguaçu
 Lima Duarte - Zeca Diabo (José Tranquilino da Conceição)
 Emiliano Queiroz - Dirceu Borboleta (Dirceu Fonseca)
 Ida Gomes - Doroteia Cajazeira
 Dorinha Duval - Dulcineia Cajazeira
 Dirce Migliaccio - Judiceia Cajazeira
 Jardel Filho - Dr. Juarez Leão
 Sandra Bréa - Telma Paraguaçu
 Zilka Salaberry - Donana Medrado
 Carlos Eduardo Dolabella - Neco Pedreira
 Lutero Luiz - Lulu Gouveia
 Milton Gonçalves - Zelão das Asas
 Gracindo Jr. - Jairo Portela
 Maria Cláudia - Gisa
 Dilma Lóes - Anita Medrado
 João Paulo Adour - Cecéu Paraguaçu
 Rogério Fróes - Vigário
 Ruth de Souza - Chiquinha do Parto
 Ana Ariel - Zora Paraguaçu
 Angelito Mello - Mestre Ambrósio
 João Carlos Barroso - Eustórgio
 Arnaldo Weiss - Libório
 Wilson Aguiar - Nezinho do Jegue
 Antônio Carlos Ganzarolli - Tião Moleza
 Ferreira Leite - Joca Medrado
 Augusto Olímpio - Cabo Ananias
 Apolo Corrêa - Maestro Sabiá
 Juan Daniel - Dom Pepito
 Suzy Arruda - Florzinha
 Isolda Cresta - Nancy
 Guiomar Gonçalves - Maria da Penha
 André Valli - Ernesto Cajazeira
 Nanai - Demerval Barbeiro
 Jorge Botelho - Nadinho
 Teresa Cristina Arnaud - Mariana
 Auriceia Araújo - Mãe de Zeca Diabo
 Júlio César - Isaque

Soundtrack

National 
 "Paiol de Pólvora" - Toquinho e Vinícius de Moraes
 "Patota de Ipanema" - Maria Creusa 
 "Veja Você" - Toquinho e Maria Creusa
 "Cotidiano N° 2" - Toquinho e Vinícius de Moraes
 "O Bem Amado" - Coral Som Livre
 "Meu Pai Oxalá" - Toquinho e Vinícius de Moraes 
 "Se o Amor Quiser Voltar" - Maria Creusa
 "Um Pouco Mais de Consideração" - Toquinho 
 "Quem És?" - Nora Ney
 "Se o Amor Quiser Voltar" - Orquestra Som Livre
 "No Colo da Serra" - Toquinho e Vinícius de Moraes

International 
 "Also Sprach Zarathustra" - Eumir Deodato 
 "Fleur de Lune" - Françoise Hardy
 "Listen" - Paul Bryan
 "Masterpiece" - The Temptations
 "I've Been Around" - Nathan Jones Group
 "Poor Devil" - Free Sound Orchestra
 "Dancing In The Moonlight" - David Jones
 "Shine Shine" - David Hill
 "Harmony" - Ben Thomas
 "Take Time To Love Me" - The John Wagner Coalition
 "Dancing To Your Music" - Archie Bell & The Drells
 "I Could Never Imagine" - Chrystian
 "Give Me Your Love" - The Sister Love
 "Daddy's Home" - Jermaine Jackson

References

External links
 

1973 Brazilian television series debuts
1973 Brazilian television series endings
1973 telenovelas
TV Globo telenovelas
Comedy telenovelas
Brazilian telenovelas
Portuguese-language telenovelas